Odbojkaški Klub Mladost Brčko, commonly referred to as OK Mladost Brčko or simply Mladost  is a volleyball club from Brčko, Bosnia and Herzegovina. It currently competes in the Premier League, the top tier volleyball league of Bosnia and Herzegovina. With seven national titles won it is one of the most successful volleyball teams in the country.

History
OK Mladost Brčko was founded in 2007. In 2018 they reached 8th Finals of the CEV Cup losing to TV Amriswil Volleyball.

Honours
Bosnia and Herzegovina Championship:
Winners (7): 2014, 2015, 2016, 2017, 2018, 2019, 2021
 Runner-up (1): 2012

Volleyball Cup of Bosnia and Herzegovina:
Winners (8): 2014, 2015, 2016, 2017, 2018, 2019, 2021, 2022
 Runner-up (1): 2011

Republika Srpska Championship:
Winners (1): 2010
Volleyball Cup of Republika Srpska:
Winners (10): 2011, 2012, 2013, 2014, 2015, 2016, 2017, 2018, 2019, 2020, 2021

European record

Recent seasons
The recent season-by-season performance of the club:

Coaching history

 Branko Mišić

References

Volleyball clubs established in 2007
2007 establishments in Bosnia and Herzegovina
Bosnia and Herzegovina volleyball clubs